The Point Theatre (sometimes referred to as the Point Depot or simply as the Point) was a concert and events venue in Dublin, Ireland, that operated from 1988 to 2007, visited by in excess of 2 million people. It was located on the North Wall Quay of the River Liffey, amongst the Dublin Docklands. The Point was closed in the middle of 2007 for a major redevelopment and underwent a rebranding as The O2 in July 2008.

Prior to the redevelopment, the seated capacity was 6,300; the rebranded O2 has a fully seated only capacity of 9,000. Following the acquisition of O2 Ireland by 3 Ireland, it was renamed in September 2014 as the 3Arena.

The Point was noted for its flexible seating configurations – over the years it served not only as a music venue, but had also been turned into an ice rink, a boxing arena, a conference hall, an exhibition centre, a wrestling ring, a theatre, an opera house and a three ring circus. It hosted the Eurovision Song Contest in 1994, 1995 and 1997 and the 1999 MTV Europe Music Awards.

History

The building was constructed in 1878 as a train depot to serve the nearby busy port. Among railwaymen it was always known as "The Point Store". In the late 1980s, after many years of neglect and disuse, it was bought by local developer, Harry Crosbie along with Apollo Leisure (now Live Nation) fitted out the venue with balconies, offices and backstage facilities. Before it was renovated, U2 recorded the second track of their 1988 album, Rattle and Hum, "Van Diemen's Land" there, and footage of performances of this song and "Desire" from the building appear in the accompanying Rattle and Hum movie.

The Point opened in 1988. Melissa Etheridge being the support act for Huey Lewis and the News was the first to play there. U2 played four nights at the venue near the end of their Lovetown Tour from 26 to 31 December 1989. Their 31 December concert was broadcast live on radio stations around the world and would later receive an official online release via iTunes.

In the 1990s, the Point was seen by millions of European television viewers, as it was the venue for the Eurovision Song Contest on three separate occasions over four years, in 1994, 1995, and 1997, becoming the only venue to have hosted the final three times. Riverdance was first performed in the Point Depot, as the interval act during the Eurovision Song Contest 1994.

Tragedy struck the Point on 11 May 1996, when a 17-year-old fan, Bernadette O'Brien was crushed to death during a Smashing Pumpkins concert. Singer Billy Corgan warned the crowd that people were getting hurt, while at one point, bassist D'arcy Wretzky announced: "There's a girl dying backstage, do you care?" The show was eventually abandoned, and a show in Belfast the following night was cancelled out of respect. Gardaí were said to be investigating why the bars in the Point remained open for the teen-packed show.

The 1999 MTV Europe Music Awards were held in the Point Depot on 11 November. Hosted by Ronan Keating, there were performances from Mariah Carey, The Corrs, Whitney Houston, Iggy Pop, Marilyn Manson and Britney Spears on the night. Award presenters included Alicia Silverstone, Mick Jagger, Pierce Brosnan, Carmen Electra, LL Cool J, Mary J. Blige, Iggy Pop, Fun Lovin' Criminals, Des'ree, Five, Christina Aguilera, Damon Albarn, Geri Halliwell and Gary Barlow. The largest winner was Britney Spears who won four awards (Best Female, Best Pop, Best Breakthrough Artist, and Best Song for "...Baby One More Time"). Boyzone won two awards (Best UK & Ireland Act and Best Album for By Request).

The final event to take place before closure and rebranding was a boxing card featuring local boxer, Bernard Dunne on 25 August 2007. Promoter Brian Peters had moved his European title defence against Kiko Martinez from Dublin's boxing-specific National Stadium across the Liffey to the Point Depot where Dunne shattered former heavyweight champion Lennox Lewis's previous attendance record for the venue.

Notable events

U2 performed on the Lovetown Tour on the 26th 27th 30th 31st 1989 OF DECEMBER  along with B.B. King  where Bono made his famous dream it up a again speech. Frank Sinatra performed at the venue on  9, 10 and 11 October 1991. Kylie Minogue performed at the venue in November 1991, on her Let's Get To It European tour, which was filmed for a VHS release the following year. She returned to the Point (after a 14-year absence) in May 2005 with her Showgirl Tour. She played six nights at the Dublin venue, just weeks before she was told she had breast cancer.

Irish band Westlife performed at the venue for a record-breaking 13 consecutive nights at year 2001 on their Where Dreams Come True Tour from 19 March to 31 March; then in 2002 6–8, 10–12, 14–18 June from World of Our Own Tour; 11–13, 15–16, 18–21 May 2004 for Turnaround Tour; 8–9, 11–13, 15–16 February, 11, 14 May 2005 for The No 1's Tour; 11–12, 15–16; 18–19 April 2006 for Face to Face Tour; and 19–21, 23–24, 26–28 April, 2–3 May 2007 for The Love Tour with a total of whopping 73 shows.

In April 1992, Neville Marriner conducted a performance of Handel's Messiah to commemorate the 250th anniversary of the work's first performance in 1742. The performance featured Sylvia McNair, Anne Sofie von Otter, Michael Chance, Jerry Hadley and Robert Lloyd, with the Academy and Chorus of St Martin in the Fields. It was released in 1992 on Philips Records both in CD format and LaserDisc format.

On 19 June 1992, Def Leppard began their Seven Day Weekend Tour of Europe in the Point Depot. The show was the first time Def Leppard had brought their "in the round" stage show outside the United States and Canada. The stage was set in the middle of the arena and featured a revolving drum kit which could move to any point around the stage and a lighting rig which would move out over the audience during "Rocket". It was the first time any band had brought an "in the round" stage show on an international concert tour and was also the first full show the band played with their new guitarist, Vivian Campbell (who had joined following the death of Steve Clark).

Nirvana began their summer 1992 European tour in support of Nevermind, at The Point on 21 June 1992 playing to a sell out crowd.

On 30 November 1992, Faith No More played a gig at The Point, having supported Guns N' Roses at Slane in May of that year. L7 provided support for the night.

The Point was the venue that introduced Riverdance to the world at the 1994 Eurovision Song Contest.

Oasis played three sold-out shows at The Point as part of their Be Here Now Tour on the 3rd, 4th and 5 December 1997. The shows were notable for the absence of frontman Liam Gallagher on the 4th and 5th, with Noel Gallagher taking over lead vocals. They later performed at The Point in December 2005. Footage from one of the 2005 gigs was included in Oasis's 2007 rockumentary, Lord Don't Slow Me Down.

On 27 June 1996 Michael Flatley's "Lord of the Dance" premiered at The Point Theatre.

The Spice Girls performed two shows on the 24 and 25 February 1998 as part of their Spiceworld Tour.

Neil Diamond played 6 shows at The Point Depot in February 1999.

The Point was the host of the MTV Europe Music Awards (EMA's) in 1999, with Ronan Keating presenting.

In 2003 Rapper Akon played the SCREAM Event to over 8,000 people at the Point with back up from M.V.P and DJ Rankin.

50 Cent's 2003 performance at the Point is briefly shown on the special features of his own film, Get Rich or Die Tryin'.

The Rolling Stones performed two shows at this venue in September 2003 as part of their European Tour.

On 8 May 2004 Cher began the European leg of her marathon Living Proof: The Farewell Tour.

In late 2004, American pop/rock star Pink began her Try This Tour in the Point.

Britney Spears performed to a sell-out crowd at what would be her last performance for three years. Her concert entourage for the Onyx Hotel Tour was the biggest ever hosted at the Point and Spears returned to the newly revamped venue now called The O2 in the summer of 2009 with her Circus Tour.

Also in 2004, on 16 December the punk rock trio Blink-182 played their last show, before going on a four-year hiatus.

Planxty performed there on 28, 29 and 30 December 2004 and again on 3, 4 and 5 January 2005 as part of their series of reunion concerts.

On 23 August 2006, Pearl Jam opened their first European tour in six years at the Point. They were originally to play the Reading and Leeds Festivals first, before playing Slane Concert; however Pearl Jam felt the Point was the perfect place to begin their tour. The concert gained wide radio play in the UK and Ireland.

Celtic Woman performed their debut concert in Ireland at the Point Theatre in February 2006, following a lengthy and enormously successful North American tour. While their first performance in Ireland was technically at The Helix in Dublin (which was filmed for PBS), the Point performance marked the group's first unveiling of the theatrical show that had taken America by storm. Jay-Z played here in 2006 also.

Tool made their third ever Irish appearance there in 2006 during their 10,000 Days tour with support from Mastodon, after previously appearing at the SFX centre in 2001 and inadvertently headlining the Ozzfest in 2002 at Punchestown Racecourse, when Ozzy Osbourne cancelled, due to illness.

Live recordings
The Theatre has been the venue for numerous live recordings subsequently released as live albums. David Gray's live performance video, David Gray: Live, released on 19 March 2001, was recorded at a sell-out show at the Point at the end of an Irish tour in December 1999. David Bowie filmed his A Reality Tour DVD in the Point during two sell-out shows there on 22–24 November 2003. R.E.M. filmed and recorded their live double CD/DVD set, R.E.M. Live in the Point on 26–27 February 2005. Bruce Springsteen recorded his 2007 album, Live in Dublin at the Point from 17 to 19 November 2006. Bell X1's live album Tour De Flock was recorded at their sell-out 1 December 2006 performance at the Point. The Venue is featured in The Corrs Documentary Home, which sees the band during sound check while on their Borrowed Heaven Tour.

Sports events
The Point has hosted many boxing fights featuring local fighter Bernard Dunne most notabally his fight for the EBU Super-Bantamweight title against Kiko Martinez. Other boxing events at the venue have been headlined by world champions Lennox Lewis, Naseem Hamed, Steve Collins and Wayne McCullough.

The Point has hosted a number of WWE Smackdown & Raw live events.

Criticism
The Point was often criticised for its poor quality of sound control and sightlines. There were also notably lengthy queues for the building's bars and restrooms, particularly for female attendees.

References

External links

 Official clips of Riverdance in 1994
 Official Smashing Pumpkins audio of deadly 1996 show – includes warnings and word of abandonment

Indoor arenas in the Republic of Ireland
Music venues in Dublin (city)
North Wall, Dublin
Dublin Docklands
Theatres in Dublin (city)
Sports venues in Dublin (city)